Mijdrecht is a town in the Netherlands with about 16,000 residents.

The main street is the Dorpstraat, where most shops and the municipal offices are located. There is a police office, a fire department, 6 supermarkets, sport facilities, and a coffee shop. There is no police or doctor at the weekends.

History

Middle Ages
In 1085 the parish of Mijdrecht, together with those of Wilnis, Tamen, Zevenhoven en Kudelstaart, was granted to the Deaconate of St. John (Proosdij van Sint-Jan), by Conrad, the Prince-bishop of Utrecht, in return for a depot in the Holland-Utrecht border region and the guarantee that the deaconate would develop the rugged terrain for habitation.
1085 is the year taken as the founding of the municipality of Mijdrecht. Remains of the famous Pepinos Hendricos, a particular hairy neanderthal kind, have been found here.

19th century
In 1815, soon after the French-Batavian period, the mayor of Mijdrecht, Hendrikus Abraham van Doorn van Noordscharwoude, submitted a questionnaire to the Minister of War. The questionnaire, about local conditions, reported a population of 3,000, including 5 carpenters, 2 smiths, 1 brazier, 2 brick-layers, 6 bakers, 8 tailors, and 6 cobblers.

20th century
Most parts of the town (like Hofland-Noord and Molenland) were built after 1980.

In 1989 the municipality of Mijdrecht was merged into De Ronde Venen.

21st century
The city has continued to grow through "Wickelhof I and II" expansions.

Demographics
During the early 20th Century, Mijdrecht was a growing community. In 1925, the then-municipality of Mijdrecht had a population of 4,506, which grew to 4,618 in 1940.
In 1950, the population of the municipality had grown to 5,379.
In 1988, the last year that Mijdrecht was a separate municipality, the municipality population was 16,414.

In recent years, Mijdrecht has had a declining population. In 2016 it had a population of 15,230, compared to 15,865 in 2010. This decline is particular in the 0-15 and 25-45 age ranges, with children (0-15) declining from 18% of the population in 2010 to 16% in 2016, and mid-range adults (25-45) declining from 25% in 2010 to 22% in 2016. By contrast, the percentage of seniors (65+) has grown from 14% in 2010 to 18% in 2016.

Neighborhoods
Mijdrecht consists of a downtown center around the Dorpstraat, and a number of planned residential neighborhoods, of which Proostdijland is the oldest.

The rural area around the town is home to another 880 inhabitants.

Governance
Ever since the mergers of the municipalities of Mijdrecht, Wilnis, and Vinkeveen/Waverveen in 1989, Mijdrecht has been governed by the Municipality of De Ronde Venen. The municipality is governed by a Municipal Council (Dutch: gemeenteraad) presently consisting of 27 councillors.

Day-to-day executive administration is performed by the council of mayor and aldermen (Dutch: college van burgemeester en wethouders). The mayor, Maarten Divendal, was appointed by the crown on 22 November 2011. The remainder of the council consists of three aldermen and the municipal secretary, who heads the municipal administration.

Business
Mijdrecht is the location for the Dutch branch of S. C. Johnson & Son, where it is housed in an office building designed by Hugh Maaskant on the Groot-Mijdrechtstraat.

The following numbers of businesses by sector were reported by Statistics Netherlands for 2016:

Culture

Education

Elementary
Mijdrecht has seven elementary schools, one in nearly all of the residential neighborhoods. A number of these are public, Catholic and Protestant.

Secondary
There is one high/secondary school called Veenlanden College. The Mijdrecht campus of the school contains around 1500 students in MAVO, HAVO and Atheneum levels.

Recreation
Mijdrecht is home to the football and basketball club SV Argon, which was created after a merger of three football clubs in Mijdrecht and Wilnis in 1971.

From 1982 until 2012, Mijdrecht was the location for an annual national festival called AJOC (Algemene Jongeren Ontspannings Club - General Youth Recreation Club).

Religion
In 1937, the provincial almanac of Utrecht reported Mijdrecht having a population of 4,717, of whom 1,838 were Roman Catholic, 1,646 Dutch Reformed, 877 Reformed, and 136 not being members of a church.
Currently, there are numerous protestant churches, of various denominations and one Catholic Church.
There was also a synagogue on the Kerkweg.

Presently, Mijdrecht also has a Muslim community with a mosque, the Hakyol Moskee in Twistvlied. The Hakyol Mosque shares an address with the Veenhartkerk, a Christian Reformed church.

Notable people
 
 
 Irfan Bachdim, Indonesian footballer
 Lesly de Sa, professional footballer
 Anouk Hoogendijk, professional footballer
 Henk Norel, professional international basketball player
 Lorena Wiebes, professional cyclist

References

External links

Populated places in Utrecht (province)
Former municipalities of Utrecht (province)
De Ronde Venen